El ojo de vidrio may refer to:

 El ojo de vidrio (film), a 1969 Mexican film 
 El ojo de vidrio (telenovela), a Mexican telenovela 
 Julio Alberto Castillo Rodríguez, a suspected Mexican drug lord